Wellington (County) was an electoral district of the Legislative Assembly in the Australian state of New South Wales, created in 1856 and named after Wellington County and including Wellington. There was also a separate Wellington and Bligh, covering part of Wellington County. In 1859, it was largely replaced by Wellington.

Members for Wellington (County)

Election results

1856

1858

References

Former electoral districts of New South Wales
1856 establishments in Australia
1859 disestablishments in Australia